Results 

25 M Rapid Fire Pistol (Men)

10 M Air Pistol (Women)

50 M Sport Rifle 3 Positions (Men)

10 M Air Pistol (Men)

Double Trap (Men)

50 M Sport Rifle 3 Positions (Women)

50 M Sport Rifle 3 Positions (Men)

50 M Free Rifle Prone (Men)

Trap (Men)

Skeet (Men)

50 M Free Pistol (Men)

10 M Air Rifle (Men)

References 

2003 in African sport
2003 in Asian sport
2003 in Indian sport